Namikawa is a Japanese surname. Notable people with the surname include: 

, Japanese photographer
, Japanese voice actor
 Namikawa Sōsuke (1847–1910), Japanese cloisonné artist
 Namikawa Yasuyuki (1845–1927), Japanese cloisonné artist

See also
 Namikawa Station

Japanese-language surnames